Isaac C. Smith (1797March 15, 1877) was an American sail and steamboat captain, shipbuilder, sparmaker and entrepreneur.

A longterm resident of Ossining, New York (then known as Sing Sing), Smith began his career working aboard Hudson River sloops, eventually rising to the rank of captain. He also built watercraft and worked as a sparmaker. In the mid-1830s, Smith was the initiator of a steamboat line from Ossining to New York City, supervising the construction of two steamboats for the line and taking command of the first.

In 1849, Smith opened a shipyard in Hoboken, New Jersey, where he built a wide variety of vessels, from small sloops to steamboats to large, full-rigged ships. In 1853 he was joined in this venture by his son J. Malcolm Smith, the firm then being renamed Isaac C. Smith & Son. About 30 ships were built at this yard before it closed in 1855 due to a nationwide shipbuilding slump. In all, Smith is said to have built about 100 ships through the course of his career, the best known of which was the 1600-ton , reputedly the most extreme clipper ever built.

Smith was also a devout Methodist and contributed to the construction of five churches of that denomination in his native town, for which he was known as "the father of Sing Sing Methodism".

Life and career 
Isaac C. Smith was born in 1797 in Sing Sing, New York, (modern day Ossining), one of a large number of children of Caleb Smith and his wife Elizabeth (née Sherwood). Smiths paternal grandfather, John Smith, was one of the earliest settlers of the region that would later become Sing Sing, and worked as a tenant and later owned a farm on the Manor of Phillipsburg.

Smith began his career at an early age, working aboard market sloops on the Hudson River. He sailed the sloop Volunteer for some 23 years, and later became captain of the sloop General Ward. He also "carried on the ship and spar building business." 
 thumb|Telegraph, built for Smiths steamboat line in 1836. 
In the mid-1830s, Smith proposed the establishment of a steamboat line to run from Sing Sing to New York City. Funds were raised from a number of interested parties including local farmers, and in 1835, the passenger-and-freight steamboat Mount Pleasant was built for the purpose at Sing Sing under Smiths supervision. After completion of the vessel, Smith was appointed her captain. Shortly after, Smith and two partners, Thomas Hulse and Jonathan Odell, organized the construction of a second steamboat, Telegraph, built in New York in 1836 by Lawrence & Sneden, with Smith again supervising construction. These two steamboats reportedly represented the first morning steamboat line established between Sing Sing and the city.

In 1849, Smith opened a shipyard in Hoboken, New Jersey under his own name. Over the next six years, Smith would build a wide variety of vessels at this yard, from sloops to steamboats to large, full-rigged ships. In 1853, Smiths son, J. Malcolm Smith, who had been advised for his health to pursue an open-air profession, joined his father in partnership, the firm then being named Isaac C. Smith & Son. Smiths Hoboken shipyard produced about thirty ships in its relatively brief existence, and for the year 1853 was the fourth most prolific New York shipyard by number of vessels built. In 1854–55 however, a deepening nationwide shipbuilding slump persuaded the Smiths to leave the business, the yards last known ship, "a beautiful clipper schooner" named Colonel John McRae being launched in March 1855. In the entire course of his career, including his output at both Hoboken and Sing Sing, Smith is said to have built a total of more than 100 vessels.

Personal details 
 thumb|upright=0.6 | Smiths son and shipbuilding partner, J. Malcolm Smith 
Isaac C. Smiths first marriage was to Maria Titlar, daughter of George, an Irish-born American who fought in the American Revolutionary War and "was one of the company who laid the great chain across the Hudson River at West Point". The marriage produced three children, J. Malcolm, Cornelia A. and George T. Smith. J. Malcolm Smith, Isaacs eldest son, was briefly a partner in his fathers Hoboken shipyard before becoming a distinguished lawyer and county clerk in White Plains and Sing Sing. Isaacs daughter Cornelia married James T. Stratton, who later became United States Surveyor-General for the state of California. Isaacs second marriage, which took place on 15 March 1854, was to Catharine McCord, widow of James McCord; daughter of James Trowbridge, a Captain in the Revolutionary War; and mother of Smith's daughter-in-law Hannah, the wife of J. Malcolm Smith.

Smith was a Methodist, and was an incorporator of and largest contributor to the construction of the first Methodist Church in Sing Sing, after which he participated in the construction of four more Sing Sing churches of the same denomination, for which he became known as the "father of Sing Sing Methodism". In his retirement, he became an enthusiastic yachtsman, taking excursions of up to a week in length with his friends aboard his small ten-ton yacht Cornelia to destinations in and around New York Harbor, New Jersey and Long Island Sound. A few months after the death of his second wife in 1874, Smith and his son J. Malcolm took an extended trip by ship and train via the Panama route to California, returning three months later.

Isaac C. Smith was "greatly respected as an honorable citizen" in his native Sing Sing. In the last year of his life, he began to have attacks of paralysis, until eventually, "convinced the end was approaching",  he joined the household of his son J. Malcolm in White Plains, where he died two months later on March 15, 1877, at the age of 79. His remains were interred in Dale Cemetery, Ossining.

Ships of note 
 thumb|Smiths best-known ship, the extreme clipper  
The largest and best-known ship built by Isaac C. Smith was the 1600-ton extreme clipper , said by some authorities to have been "the sharpest sailing ship ever constructed by any builder". On an 1854 voyage from New York to San Francisco, Hurricane was on track to challenge Flying Clouds all-time record passage of 89 days, until adverse conditions over the last 1000 miles lengthened her passage to a still outstanding 100 days. On another voyage, from Portsmouth, England to Calcutta, India, in 1855, Hurricane set a record of 82 1/4 days from The Needles to the mouth of the Hooghly River that remained unbeaten for many years.

Smith built two other clippers, the 820-ton , built in 1853, and the small 470-ton Tejuca, completed in 1854. On an 1855 voyage, Tejuca made "one of the quickest passages on record" from Rio de Janeiro, Brazil, to New Orleans. Less than a year later however, she foundered in a hurricane, the majority of her crew being rescued by a daring maneouvre of the ship Excelsior, for which Excelsiors captain later received an award for heroism.

Smith also built a substantial number of steam vessels, including steamboats, towboats and tugs. The largest of these was the 800-ton freight steamboat Atlas, built in 1852, which had the unusual design feature of external iron strapping for strengthening of her exceptionally broad-beamed hull. Another of Smiths steamboats, Ocean Wave, became notorious for the manner of her demise. After 17 years of service, Ocean Wave was found to be in too poor a condition for passenger service and was restricted by the authorities to freight-only service, but her owners ignored the restriction and continued to use the vessel for weekend passenger excursions. On one such excursion in August 1871, Ocean Waves defective boiler exploded, sinking the steamer and killing over 70 passengers and crew.

Shipbuilding record 

Isaac C. Smith, both alone and in partnership with his son J. Malcolm Smith, is known to have built about thirty ships at Hoboken. Given that Smith is said to have built more than 100 ships in the course of his career, another 60 or more were presumably built by him at Ossining. As scant record of these latter vessels has been found, probably they were mostly small watercraft of little individual historic interest such as Hudson River sloops.

Footnotes

References

Bibliography 
 
  
  
  
  
  
  
  
  
  
  
 
  
  
  
 
 

1797 births
1877 deaths
American shipbuilders
Defunct shipbuilding companies of the United States
People from Ossining, New York